Indraneil Sengupta  is an Indian film and television actor, and a model living in Kolkata since 2004.

Career
Sengupta was a finalist of the 1999 Gladrags Manhunt Contest in which John Abraham was the winner. He modelled for designer Rohit Bal and worked for choreographers Marc Robinson and Achala Sachdev. He also appeared in commercials for the Tata Indigo Marina car, VIP Frenchie and Aquafina.

Later, he transitioned into music videos, including those for Falguni Pathak's "Pal pal tere yaad sataye" and Jagjit Singh; one for the south Indian singer Yesudas's Hindi album; and a remix of the old film song "Koi diya jale kahin (rum pum bum)", sung by Asha Bhosle from the movie Bees Saal Baad. He also appeared in a television show on STAR Plus, Pyaar ke do naam...Ek Radha Ek Shyaam.

In 2004, he starred in the film Shukriya: Till Death Do Us Apart which also starred Aftab Shivdasani, Shriya Saran and Anupam Kher. He was to act in the movie Dus but the project got shelved.

In 2008, he played the negative role of Mohan Kanta, a British Indian army man who betrays his revolting pro-independence military regiment in the horror film 1920, written and directed by Vikram Bhatt. He also starred as Tushaar in the Zee TV serial Banoo Main Teri Dulhan.

He appeared with his wife in Nach Baliye 3 as a late entrant.

He starred in Bollywood movies Mumbai Salsa and Kahaani. He has also done a few Bengali films. In 2008, he starred in Janala, also starring Swastika Mukherjee and directed by Buddhadeb Dasgupta.

At the beginning of 2009, he starred opposite Indrani Haldar in Angshumaner Chhobi, which was directed by first-time filmmaker, Atanu Ghosh. The film was the only Bengali entry in the competitive section of the Indian Panorama in Goa. In late 2009, he starred as a bisexual lover in Kaushik Ganguly's Arekti Premer Golpo. His love interest in this film is director Rituparno Ghosh, and this was Rituparno's first movie as an actor.

In 2010, he did his first commercial Bengali film, Jodi Ekdin, directed by Riingo. Indraneil received the Anandalok Fresh Face of the Year (male) award in 2009 for Anshumaner Chobi.

Indraneil starred as a young aspiring director in the Bengali movie Autograph with Prasenjit Chatterjee and Nandana Sen.  The movie is a tribute to both Satyajit Ray and to Uttam Kumar as it is on the lines of the film Nayak.

In 2012 he acted in the Aniruddha Roy Chowdhury-directed Bengali movie Aparajita Tumi, in which he played a young Bangladeshi professor. He played the role of a criminal in the Hindi film Kahaani, directed by Sujoy Ghosh in the same year. In 2012 he also played a role in a Bangladeshi movie, Chorabali.

He also starred in Goyenda Gogol, which was released in 2013.

He also starred in Teen Patti, a Bengali film directed by Jenny Sarkar and Dipayan Mandal.

Filmography

Films

Web series

Television

Awards
2008 - ITA Award for Idea Glamour Face of the Year Male
2014 - Filmfare Award for Best Supporting Actor (Bengali) for Mishawr Rawhoshyo

Personal life
On 1 March 2008, Sengupta married Barkha Bisht Sengupta who was his co-star in Doli Saja Ke and Pyaar ke do naam...Ek Radha Ek Shyaam. They have a daughter named Meira, who was born in October 2011.

References

External links

 
 Shyaam- Shyaama saga goes on, The Hindu – 1 April 2006.
 READY, STEADY, GO!, The Times of India – 24 Mar 2006.

Indian male television actors
Indian male models
Living people
Bengali people
Indian male film actors
Candidates in the 2014 Indian general election
1974 births